Ahmad Kandi (also Romanized as Aḩmad Kandī; also known as Akhmadkandi) is a village in Ijrud-e Bala Rural District, in the Central District of Ijrud County, Zanjan Province, Iran. At the 2006 census, its population was 894, in 209 families.

References 

Populated places in Ijrud County